Helbeck is a civil parish in the Eden District, Cumbria, England.  It contains three listed buildings that are recorded in the National Heritage List for England.  Of these, one is listed at Grade II*, the middle of the three grades, and the others are at Grade II, the lowest grade.  The listed buildings comprise a country house, an associated coach house, and an observation tower.


Key

Buildings

References

Citations

Sources

Lists of listed buildings in Cumbria